Gerald Robert O'Sullivan VC (8 November 1888–21 August 1915) was an Irish recipient of the Victoria Cross, the highest and most prestigious award for gallantry in the face of the enemy that can be awarded to British and Commonwealth forces.

Early life
Gerald Robert O'Sullivan was born in Frankfield, Douglas, County Cork on 8 November 1888. His father was a career soldier in the Argyll and Sutherland Highlanders. Known as 'Jerry', he was educated at Wimbledon College from which he graduated in 1906. He desired a career in the British Army and attended the Royal Military Academy at Sandhurst.

Military career
Commissioned into the Royal Inniskilling Fusiliers in 1909, O'Sullivan spent much of the next three years serving in China with his unit, 2nd Battalion. From 1912, the battalion was based in British India but on the outbreak of the First World War was brought back to England.

First World War
The Royal Inniskilling Fusiliers formed part of 29th Division, intended for service in the Gallipoli Campaign. Now a captain in the 1st Battalion, he commanded a company during the landing at X Beach on the Gallipoli peninsula on 25 April 1915 and acquitted himself well during the early stages of the fighting. On 18 June 1915, the Turks mounted an attack on positions adjacent to those of O'Sullivan's company, forcing the troops manning the defenses to abandon it. He led his company in a counterattack to reclaim the lost position which exchanged hands several times during the next few hours. The commanding officer in the area, Brigadier General W. R. Marshall, eventually directed O'Sullivan to lead a party of Inniskilling and South Wales Borderers soldiers to capture the position which was achieved at dawn the following day.

Two weeks later, O'Sullivan was involved in a further action near Krithia, and this resulted in his recommendation for the Victoria Cross (VC). The citation, published in the London Gazette on 1 September 1915, read as follows: 

The wounds he received in the action of 1–2 July necessitated his evacuation to Egypt for medical treatment but he quickly recovered and returned to his unit on 11 August 1915. The 29th Division was now at Suvla Bay and preparing for a new offensive. The Inniskillings were tasked with the capture of a feature known as Hill 70 or Scimitar Hill. During this battle, on 21 August 1915, he led a charge of 50 men to the hilltop but was killed.

O'Sullivan has no known grave and is remembered on the Helles Memorial to the Missing.  His VC was delivered to his mother who lived in Dorchester, and his name also appears on the memorial there.

Notes

References

 The Roll of Honour of the Empire's Heroes

External links
 

1888 births
1915 deaths
Irish officers in the British Army
People from Cork (city)
People educated at Wimbledon College
Graduates of the Royal Military College, Sandhurst
Royal Inniskilling Fusiliers officers
British Army personnel of World War I
British military personnel killed in World War I
Irish Gallipoli campaign recipients of the Victoria Cross
British Army recipients of the Victoria Cross
Military personnel from County Cork